The Community Radio Network (CRN) was a network of radio stations based in provincial centres across New Zealand. The network was operated by The Radio Network (TRN). 

Established in June 1998, each radio station in the network retained its local name and  broadcast a live breakfast show from the centre in which it was based and then during the day and overnight would pick up the network feed broadcast from Taupo. (Programme would be fed from Huka Falls Road Taupo to The Radio Network's Auckland Street premises for upload to the Optus Satellite where it was then received in the various markets).

The network on-air line up originally included:
Mark Bramley (10a - 2p)
Aaron Gillions (2p - 7p)
Peter Gosney (7p - 12a)

In late 1998, the lineup would change to:

Mark Bramley (10a - 2p)
Scott Armstrong (2p - 7p) (Brian Gentil in 2000)
Peter Gosney (7p - 12a) (Corey K and Duncan Allen in 2000)

Other voices heard on the network included Geoff Bargas, Rebecca Ali, Nadine Christiansen, Sarah McMullan, Chris Auer, Marke Dickson and Paul Frost.

On 1 December 2000, CRN stations joined the Classic Hits programme fed from Cook Street Auckland, also operated by TRN.  Where the station had both an FM and AM frequency the FM frequency was usually used to broadcast a localised version of  Classic Hits while the AM frequency was used to broadcast Newstalk ZB.

CRN as a division of TRN remained, providing creative services, writing and producing commercials for each of the stations.   

CRN was later renamed to 'The Provincial Group'.

Members
 Radio Waitomo 1ZW - Waitomo (Sold in 2004, ceased broadcasting in 2005)
 Tokoroa - Radio Forestland
 Taumarunui - King Country Radio (Ceased broadcasting in 2010)
 Taupo - Lakeland FM
 Gisborne - 2ZG / ZGFM
 Masterton - Radio Wairarapa
 Wanganui - River City FM
 Blenheim - Radio Marlborough
 West Coast - Scenicland FM
 Ashburton - 3ZE / ZEFM
 Timaru - South Canterbury's 99FM
 Oamaru - Radio Waitaki

Community radio stations in New Zealand
New Zealand radio networks

Radio stations established in 1998 
Radio stations disestablished in 2000
Defunct radio stations in New Zealand